Johan Olsson may refer to:

 Johan Olsson (ice hockey) (born 1978), Swedish ice hockey player
 Johan Olsson (skier) (born 1980), Swedish cross-country skier
 Johan Olsson, Swedish former guitarist of Dead by April